In Japan,  form the base of the country's legal community.

History

Pre-Meiji restoration
Historically, Japanese customs instituted an avoidance of legal involvement, based upon Confucian doctrines, and Japanese principles of harmony; anyone brought before a court for a criminal or civil matter suffered public and private humiliation, since they disrupted harmony.

Nevertheless, by the 18th century, innkeepers in Edo began offering simple legal services for guests. They were known as Kujishi. By the 19th century, references began to appear in Japanese literature on the role of "European-style" lawyers.

Officially recognized legal representatives in civil trials, known as daigennin, began to appear by the mid-19th century. No legal training was required to be a daigennin.

Meiji restoration
Regulation of legal professionals began during the Meiji Restoration. In 1890, the Criminal Code was amended, which recognized the right to legal representation during a criminal trial. The state's representative at the trial, known as a Procurator, was given the prestige of being a government official. By association, it unofficially granted a modicum of official status to the daigennin.

The government also required the establishment of bar associations at each district court, and by 1893, the Lawyer's Law was promulgated, officially regulating the legal profession by setting standards for, as well as legitimatizing, attorneys at law.

Post-World War II
 was promulgated in 1949, which officially laid down the mission of an attorney at law, as well as establishing other requirements for those in the profession.

The legal industry
The legal profession in Japan (hōsō) comprises judges, prosecutors, and attorneys. In Japan, judges are not selected from experienced lawyers, but instead are selected after the one-year of mandatory "Legal Training Research Institute". 

More than 100 universities have an undergraduate law faculty, which means that many people study law at the undergraduate level and go work for companies in a role that is unrelated to law.

As of August 2014, there are 35,031 attorneys registered with bar associations in Japan, which is up from 22,049 in April 2005.

Due to cultural traditions, Japanese have rarely used lawsuits as a means to settle disputes. With the rise of patent-disputes and international mergers, however, Japan is facing a shortage of lawyers, and the government has allowed universities to offer graduate courses on law, in order to ease the shortage. The push to produce lawyers has also been reflected in the demographics of the legal community, where 25.3% of the lawyers surveyed in 2008 had only been admitted to the bar for less than 5 years.

Starting salaries for Japanese attorneys are typically around 10 million yen (US$100,000) in established law firms, and about half as much in Japanese companies. In-house counsel are still relatively rare in Japan, with only 770 of the 32,000 registered bengoshi working in corporate law departments as of January 2013. 

Foreign law firms have been permitted to hire Japanese attorneys since 2005, and some such firms such as Morrison & Foerster and White & Case have built large Japanese law practices that handle domestic matters for domestic clients. Some foreign firms that built bengoshi practices under this system, such as Linklaters and Allen & Overy, have since downsized or eliminated their bengoshi teams, while others such as Herbert Smith Freehills elected to rely on referral relationships with the Big Four law firms rather than competing with them by employing bengoshi within the firm.

Qualification

Candidates who complete the qualification process are bengoshi, and are permitted to wear a lapel pin of a balance surrounded by a sunflower, respectively symbolizing justice/liberty (sunflower) and fairness/equality (balance).

There were 72 law schools as of July 2013 in Japan. Applications to law schools in Japan have been declining sharply, from approximately 70,000 applicants in 2004 to approximately 20,000 in 2015. This is due to the high tuition, difficulty of finding employment, and the increased enrollment in pre-examination.

The types of quasi-lawyers are patent agents (benrishi), tax agents (zerishi), judicial scriveners (shiho shoshi), and administrative scriveners (gyosei shoshi).

Bar examination
Before 2006, the bar examination consisted of three stages. The first stage, held in May, consisted of 60 multiple choice questions regarding constitutional law, civil law and criminal law. The second stage, held over two days in July, consisted of twelve essay questions regarding constitutional law, civil law, criminal law, commercial law, civil procedure law and criminal procedure law. The final stage, held in October, was an oral examination regarding constitutional law, civil law, criminal law, civil procedure law and criminal procedure law. Final results were published in mid-November. On average, 40,000–50,000 people took the first stage, 7,000–8,000 qualified for the second stage, and only 1,500 qualified for the oral examination each year.

In 2006, a new bar examination was instituted with only two stages. The first stage is a one-day short-answer examination concerning the six laws as well as administrative law. The second stage is a three-day essay examination concerning public law, civil law and criminal law, as well as subjects that can be selected by the examinee (including labor law, environmental law, public international law, and private international law). In addition, a law school requirement was introduced. All bar examination participants must complete a two or three-year graduate law program, and are limited to taking the examination within five years after graduation.

Those who have not graduated from law school may take the bar examination after passing a preliminary qualifying examination ("Yobi-Shiken"). But passing a preliminary exam is still a minor path and most people are from law school. In 2015, the pass rate for the pre-examination was 3%. This path allows to skip law school and thus avoid paying high tuition.

Japanese Bar exam is known as one of the most difficult exams in the world. Although the bar pass rates are getting higher after the structural reform in 2006, only around 20% of the law school graduates pass the bar. Therefore, the top law schools in Japan are competing with each other by achieving higher bar pass rate. Students can attempt to pass the bar only five times, after which they are disqualified. Until 2013, they could attempt the bar examination only three times. Most students study at independent private schools in order to pass the bar examination, in addition to law school. The average age of those passing the bar examination is 28–29 years old.

Legal Training and Research Institute of Supreme Court
Those who have passed the bar examination participate in a one-year training process for studying practical skills (the skills for judges, prosecutors, and lawyers) in the LTRI. The training at the LTRI consist of (1) collective training (classes in the classroom); (2) field training (apprentices to judges, prosecutors and law offices). LTRI focuses on teaching the litigation skills. When the students pass the final examination (nikai shiken) at the LTRI, they become lawyers, prosecutors or judges. Prosecutors and judges are handpicked by the LTRI.

Bar association membership
According to a 2008 survey by the Japanese Federation of Bar Associations (JFBA), 39.4% of all lawyers belong to the three Tokyo bar associations (Tokyo Bar Association, First Tokyo Bar Association, and Second Tokyo Bar Association).

Female attorneys
As of August 2014, there were 6,326 female attorneys in Japan that were admitted to the bar, comprising about 18% of Japanese lawyers.

Membership for foreign attorneys
A total of 412 foreign-law attorneys were registered as of April 1, 2018.

Before World War II, attorneys qualified in foreign countries could join a Japanese bar with special permission from the Supreme Court. None remains in practice today.

The quasi-membership was abolished by judicial reforms in 1955, and was replaced by the  membership in 1986.

Attorneys in Okinawa who had been admitted as U.S. attorneys before the repatriation in 1972 were admitted as Japanese attorneys. They are classified by the Japanese Federation of Bar Associations (JFBA) as "Special members in Okinawa", and nine of them are still in practice as of August 2014.

Corporate membership
Large law firms have been organized in Tokyo, Osaka and other major cities, and have grown dramatically in recent years. Since 2002, these law firms can also join as members in their own right.

See also
 Judicial system of Japan
 Phoenix Wright

References

External links
 Japan Federation of Bar Associations

Law of Japan
Region-specific legal occupations